Selfoss is a waterfall on the river Jökulsá á Fjöllum in the north of Iceland.  The river drops over a number of waterfalls over about 30 km before flowing into Öxarfjörður, a bay of the Arctic Sea. The river originates as melt water from the glacier Vatnajökull and therefore the water flow varies depending on the season, the weather and volcanic activity.

A few hundred meters downstream of the -high waterfall is Dettifoss, the second-most powerful waterfall in Europe. Below the falls, the river passes through a gorge which is part of the Jökulsárgljúfur National Park.

Gallery

See also
 Waterfalls of Iceland
 List of waterfalls

References

External links

 

Waterfalls of Iceland